Seed predation, often referred to as granivory, is a type of plant-animal interaction in which granivores (seed predators) feed on the seeds of plants as a main or exclusive food source, in many cases leaving the seeds damaged and not viable. Granivores are found across many families of vertebrates (especially mammals and birds) as well as invertebrates (mainly insects); thus, seed predation occurs in virtually all terrestrial ecosystems. Seed predation is commonly divided into two distinctive temporal categories, pre-dispersal and post-dispersal predation, which affect the fitness of the parental plant and the dispersed offspring (the seed), respectively. Mitigating pre- and post-dispersal predation may involve different strategies. To counter seed predation, plants have evolved both physical defenses (e.g. shape and toughness of the seed coat) and chemical defenses (secondary compounds such as tannins and alkaloids). However, as plants have evolved seed defenses, seed predators have adapted to plant defenses (e.g., ability to detoxify chemical compounds). Thus, many interesting examples of coevolution arise from this dynamic relationship.

Seeds and their defenses  

Plant seeds are important sources of nutrition for animals across most ecosystems. Seeds contain food storage organs (e.g., endosperm) that provide nutrients to the developing plant embryo (cotyledon). This makes seeds an attractive food source for animals because they are a highly concentrated and localized nutrient source in relation to other plant parts.

Seeds of many plants have evolved a variety of defenses to deter predation. Seeds are often contained inside protective structures or fruit pulp that encapsulate seeds until they are ripe. Other physical defenses include spines, hairs, fibrous seed coats and hard endosperm. Seeds, especially in arid areas, may have a mucilaginous seed coat that can glue soil to seed hiding it from granivores.

Some seeds have evolved strong anti-herbivore chemical compounds. In contrast to physical defenses, chemical seed defenses deter consumption using chemicals that are toxic or distasteful to granivores or that inhibit the digestibility of the seed. These chemicals include toxic non-protein amino acids, cyanogenic glycosides, protease and amylase inhibitors, and phytohemaglutinins. Plants may face trade-offs between allocation toward defenses and the size and number of seeds produced.

Plants may reduce the severity of seed predation by making seeds spatially or temporally scarce to granivores. Seed dispersal away from the parent plant is hypothesized to reduce the severity of seed predation. Seed masting is an example of how plant populations are able to temporally regulate the severity of seed predation.  Masting refers to a concerted abundance of seed production followed by a period of paucity. This strategy has the potential to regulate the size of the population of seed predators.

Seed predation vs. seed dispersal 
Adaptations to defend seeds against predation can impact seeds' ability to germinate and disperse. Thus anti-predator adaptations often occur in a suite of adaptations for a particular seed life history.  For example, chili plants selectively deter mammal seed predators and fungi using capsaicin, which does not deter bird seed dispersers because bird taste receptors do not bind with capsaicin. Chili seeds in turn have higher survival if they pass through a bird's stomach than if they fall to the ground.

Pre- and post-dispersal 

Seed predation can occur both before and after seed dispersal.

Pre-dispersal

Pre-dispersal seed predation takes place when seeds are removed from the parent plant before dispersal, and it has been most often reported in invertebrates, birds, and in granivorous rodents that clip fruits directly from trees and herbaceous plants. Post-dispersal seed predation arises once seeds have been released from the parent plant. Birds, rodents, and ants are known to be among the most pervasive postdispersal seed predators. Furthermore, postdispersal seed predation can take place at two contrasting stages: predation on the "seed rain" and predation on the "seed bank". Whereas predation on the seed rain occurs when animals prey on released seeds usually flush with the ground surface, predation on the seed bank takes place after seeds have been incorporated deeply into the soil. Nevertheless, there are important vertebrate pre-dispersal predators, especially birds and small mammals.

Post-dispersal

Post-dispersal seed predation is extremely common in virtually all ecosystems. Given the heterogeneity in both resource type (seeds from different species), quality (seeds of different ages and/or different status of integrity or decomposition) and location (seeds are scattered and hidden in the environment), most post-dispersal predators have generalist habits. These predators belong to a diverse array of animals, such as ants, beetles, crabs, fish, rodents and birds. The assemblage of post-dispersal seed predators varies considerably among ecosystems. A dispersed seed is the first independent life stage of a plant, thus post-dispersal seed predation is the first potential mortality event and one of the first biotic interactions in a plant's life cycle.

Differences

Both pre- and post-dispersal seed predation are common. Pre-dispersal predators differ from post-dispersal predators in most often being specialists, adapted to clustered resources (on the plant). They use specific cues like plant chemistry (volatile compounds), color, and size to locate seeds, and their short life cycles often match the production of seeds by the host plant. Insect groups containing many pre-dispersal seed predators are Coleoptera, Hemiptera, Hymenoptera and Lepidoptera.

Effects on plant demography 

The complex relationship between seed predation and plant demography is an important topic of plant-animal interactive studies. Plant population structure and size over time is closely associated with the effectiveness at which seed predators locate, consume, and disperse seeds. In many cases this relationship depends on the type of seed predator (specialist vs. generalist) or the particular habitat in which the interaction is taking place. The role of seed predation on plant demography may be either detrimental or in particular cases actually beneficial to plant populations.

The Janzen-Connell model concerns how seed density and survival respond to distance from the parent tree and differential rates of seed predation. Seed density is hypothesized to decrease as distance from the parent tree increases. Where seeds are most abundant under the parent tree, seed predation is predicted to be at its highest. As distance from the parent tree increases, seed abundance and thus seed predation are predicted to decrease as seed survival increases.

The degree to which seed predation influences plant populations may vary by whether a plant species is safe site limited or seed limited. If a population is safe site limited it is likely that seed predation will have little impact to the success of the population. In safe site limited populations increased seed abundance does not translate into increased seedling recruitment. However, if a population is seed limited, seed predation has a better chance of negatively affecting the plant population by decreasing seedling recruitment. Maron and Simms found both safe site limited and seed limited populations depending on the habitat in which the seed predation was taking place. In dune habitats seed predators (deer mice) were limiting seedling recruitment in the population, thus negatively affecting the population. However, in grassland habitat the seed predator had little effect on the plant population because it was safe site limited.

In many cases seed predators support plant populations by dispersing seeds away from the parent plant, in effect supporting gene flow between populations. Other seed predators collect seeds and then store or cache them for later consumption. In the case that the seed predator is unable to locate the buried or hidden seed there is a chance that it will later germinate and grow, supporting the species dispersal. Generalist (vertebrate) seed predators may also aid the plant in other indirect ways, for instance by inducing top-down control on host-specific seed predators (termed "intra-guild predation"), and as such negating Janzen-Connell type effects and so benefiting the plant in competition with other plant species.

See also 
 Consumer-resource systems
 Egg predation
 Harvester ant
 Herbivory
 Seed dispersal

References

Further reading

Herbivory
Plant reproduction
Animals by eating behaviors